Berthelet may refer to :

Bartholomeus Anglicus (d. 1272), also known as Berthelet, author of De Proprietatibus Rerum
Antoine-Olivier Berthelet (1798 – 1872), businessman, philanthropist, and political figure of Lower Canada
Jacques Berthelet (b. 1934), bishop emeritus of Saint-Jean-Longueuil in Montreal